GiroBank may refer to:

 Girobank, a former UK bank
 GiroBank, a former Danish bank (1991-1995) which through several mergers is now part of Danske Bank